Roko may refer to:

 Roko (given name), a Croatian masculine name
 Roko, a surname:
 Amy Roko, the stage name of a Saudi Arabian comedian
 Nasoni Roko, a Fijian rugby union player
 Roko (title), a title of chiefly rank used in Fiji, including:
 Roko Sau, a title held by the Paramount Chief of the Lau Islands in Fiji
 Roko Tui, the title for the executive head of any one of Fiji’s 14 Provincial Councils
 Roko Tui Dreketi, the Paramount Chief of Fiji's Rewa Province and of the Burebasaga Confederacy
 Roko Tui Namata, the title of the Paramount Chief of the Namata district in Fiji's Tailevu Province
 Raasta roko, meaning "obstruct the road" in Hindi; a form of protest 
 Roko Aero aircraft builders in Zlin, Czech Republic, the makers of the Roko Aero NG4
 Roko's Basilisk, a hypothetical future artificial intelligence posited in a thought experiment by LessWrong contributor Roko
 ROKO Construction, civil engineering and construction company, based in Uganda, active in Uganda, Rwanda, DR Congo and South Sudan.